Mian Rudan is the alternate name of Mianrud, a city in Khuzestan Province, Iran.

Mian Rudan or Meyan Rudan may also refer to:
 Mian Rudan, Ardabil
 Mian Rudan, Chaharmahal and Bakhtiari
 Mian Rudan, Lorestan
 Mian Rudan, Markazi